Queen Mary's Technical Institute was founded in 1917 in Bombay, India by Lady Marie Willingdon as Queen Mary's Technical School for disabled soldiers. It moved to Pune in 1923.

Background
Lady Marie Willingdon, the wife of  the Governor of Bombay, founded the School in May 1917 to help thousands of Indian Soldiers in Bombay who had become disabled during World War I. It moved to Pune in 1923. It was started with personal donation of rupees 10 Lakhs (one million rupees) each from Queen Mary and Lady Marie Willingdon. Its name was changed from Queen Mary's Technical school to Queen Mary's Technical Institute in 1966. It is run as a charitable educational institution and its trustees are ex Indian Army personnel.

Goals and objectives
Its admission is open to disabled personnel of the Indian Army and other paramilitary forces. It provides vocational training to disabled personnel to help them be self-sufficient and helps them reintegrate into the mainstream and help them earn a livelihood independently.

References

External links
Queen Mary's Technical Institute Official Website

Disability organisations based in India
Organisations based in Pune
Educational institutions established in 1917
Military medical organizations
Indian Army
1917 establishments in India